List of closed railway stations in London lists closed heavy rail passenger stations within the Greater London area. Stations served only by London Underground or its predecessors, by Tramlink, and by the Docklands Light Railway are not included.

Scope
Each station has a major place name and a railway reference which is generally the founding company but it may be another interested company or a line. The stations' linked articles give more details.
The full form of an abbreviation is seen by rolling over; linkage to "unwritten" articles and repeated linkage are retained to allow that.

"Replacement" is either a station which took over directly one closed, as King's Cross for Maiden Lane, or one built later at the same location as some DLR stations were, "+/-" after a replacement's name indicates that it was near the disused station but slightly displaced along the same path. Stations not replaced are marked "None".

Stations with the same name are differentiated, usually by company abbreviations as superscripts.

§ after a station name means renamed before closure. Some stations were renamed several times.
► after a replacement station means "later renamed as".
 after a replacement name indicates a Tramlink tram stop rather than a station.
† after a grid reference shows site was not identified, only inferred from street names etc.

Stations

See also

Closed London Underground stations
List of closed railway stations in Britain
List of London railway stations
List of London Underground stations
List of Docklands Light Railway stations
Tramlink
:Category:Lists of railway stations in the United Kingdom

References

Further reading 
 Borley, H.V. (1982) Chronology of London Railways. Railway and Canal Historical Society. Oakham, Leicester 

 Connor, J.E. (2000) G.W.R. Disused Stations in Greater London. Connor & Butler, Colchester, 
 Connor, J.E. (2002) London's Disused Stations, Volume Three, The London, Chatham & Dover Railway.  Connor & Butler, Colchester, 
 Connor, J.E. (2003) London's Disused Stations, Volume Four, The South Eastern Railway, including the Woodside & South Croydon Joint Line.  Connor & Butler, Colchester, 
 Connor, J.E. (2005) London's Disused Stations, Volume Five, The London & South Western Railway, including the Tooting Merton & Wimbledon Railway and West London Extension Railways.  Connor & Butler, Colchester, 
 Connor, J.E. (2006) London's Disused Stations, Volume Six, The London Brighton & South Coast Railway.  Connor & Butler, Colchester, 
 Connor, J.E. (2009) London's Disused Stations, Volume Seven, The Midland Railway and Associated Lines.  Connor & Butler, Colchester, 
 Connor, J.E. and Halford, B.L. Forgotten Stations of Greater London, Connor & Butler 1991.  .
 Course, E. (1962) London Railways, Batsford Ltd. London
 Jackson, A.A. London's Local Railways, David & Charles, 1978,  
 Klapper, C. (1976) London's Lost Railways, Routledge & Kegan Paul Ltd.  
 Marshall, C.F.D (1963) History of the Southern Railway, 2nd ed, Ian Allan, London
 Mitchell, V. and Smith, K. (1990a). London Suburban Railways - Charing Cross to Dartford. Middleton Press. 
 Mitchell, V. and Smith, K. (1990b). London Suburban Railways - Holborn Viaduct to Lewisham including the Greenwich Park branch. Middleton Press. 
 Mitchell, V. and Smith, K. (1991). London Suburban Railways - Lewisham to Dartford via Bexleyheath and Sidcup. Middleton Press.  
 Mitchell, V. and Smith, K. (1992). London Suburban Railways - West Croydon to Epsom. Middleton Press. . 
 Wall, M (2003) Lost Railways of Middlesex, Countryside Books, Newbury

Closed railway stations
 
London transport-related lists